Trinity Garden Cartel are an American Southern hip hop group from Houston, Texas, most significantly known for their controversial 1994 release on Rap-A-Lot Records, Don't Blame It On Da Music.

Discography
Studio albums

References

Musical groups from Houston
Southern hip hop groups
Gangsta rap groups